Maximilian “Max” Wilhelm Gustav Moritz von Prittwitz und Gaffron (27 November 1848 – 29 March 1917) was an Imperial German general. He fought in the Austro-Prussian War, the Franco-Prussian War, and briefly in the First World War.

Family
Prittwitz came from an old aristocratic Silesian family in Bernstadt (now Bierutów, Poland). His father was Gustav von Prittwitz, a Prussian general, and his mother was Elizabeth von Klass.

On 19 May 1874 Prittwitz married Olga von Dewitz (30 August 1848 – 9 January 1938), the daughter of Kurt von Dewitz, a landowner and his wife Euphemia, née von der Groeben. Their only son died on 23 May 1918.

Early military career
After attending a school in Oels, Prittwitz joined the 3rd Guard Grenadier Regiment and fought in the Austro-Prussian War. He was then commissioned as a junior officer in the 38th Fusileers with which regiment he served in the Franco-Prussian War.  After attending the Prussian Military Academy Prittwitz was appointed to the 6th Jaeger Battalion. He subsequently held a number of General Staff positions, interspersed with company and battalion commander appointments in various infantry regiments. In 1913 he was appointed as Generaloberst (full general), in command of the XVI Corps in Metz.

World War I
On 2 August 1914, at the outbreak of the First World War, Prittwitz was appointed commander of the Eighth Army and assigned to defend East Prussia from an expected Russian attack.

When the Russian invasion threatened his rear, Prittwitz suggested a retreat to the west of the Vistula. This meant abandoning East Prussia, which the German General Staff found unacceptable. Additionally, commander of the I Corps Hermann von François complained to the General Staff that his superior was panicking; the General Staff concurred in this assessment. Prittwitz was promptly replaced as Eighth Army commander by Paul von Hindenburg on 23 August 1914.  Hindenburg, and Erich Ludendorff as replacement for Chief of Staff Georg von Waldersee, then destroyed the two invading Russian armies at the Battles of Tannenberg and the Masurian Lakes. 

Prittwitz retired to Berlin, where he lived for three years before dying of a heart attack. He was buried in the Invalids' Cemetery (Invalidenfriedhof) in Berlin.

Honours and awards

References

See also
Who’s Who: Maximilian von Prittwitz

1848 births
1917 deaths
People from Bierutów
People from the Province of Silesia
Silesian nobility
German Army generals of World War I
German military personnel of the Franco-Prussian War
Prussian people of the Austro-Prussian War
Colonel generals of Prussia
Members of the Prussian House of Lords
Burials at the Invalids' Cemetery
19th-century Prussian military personnel
Recipients of the Iron Cross (1870), 2nd class
Grand Crosses of the Military Merit Order (Bavaria)